Adam James Ball (born 1 March 1993) is an English cricketer who plays for Suffolk County Cricket Club. Ball is a batting allrounder who played top level cricket for Kent County Cricket Club from 2010 until 2017 and was captain of the England Under-19 cricket team.

Early life and education
Ball was born in Greenwich in south-east London. He was educated at Beths Grammar School in Bexley and at the University of Kent where he studied Sports Science. He was a member of the Kent Cricket Academy and won a sponsorship to study at the university whilst a member of the county squad. As a child, Ball was a "promising footballer" who played for Arsenal in under-9 to under-12 age group teams.

Cricket career
Ball grew up playing for Bexley Cricket Club in the Kent Cricket League. He was called in to the England under-19 squad in December 2009 as a 16 year old and made his debut in January 2010 against Afghanistan Under-19s in the 2010 Under-19 World Cup. He signed his first professional contract with Kent in February of the same year, still only 16.

His senior Kent debut came later in 2010 against Durham in the 2010 Clydesdale Bank 40 and was followed by his first-class cricket debut the following season against Gloucestershire.

Ball played for England under-19s until 2012, captaining the side in the 2012 Under-19 World Cup in Australia. After an immediate impact in Kent's limited overs sides he later found opportunities to play for Kent "limited". He was released by Kent at the end of the 2017 season, joining Suffolk County Cricket Club as a professional player in March 2018. Ball played for Copdock and Old Ipswichian in the East Anglian Premier Cricket League during the season, but his work commitments meant that he was unable to play as frequently as required and he was not re-engaged as a professional by the county in 2019.

References

External links

1993 births
Living people
People from Greenwich
English cricketers
Kent cricketers
Alumni of the University of Kent
Suffolk cricketers